Janez Skok (born June 18, 1963 in Ljubljana) is a Yugoslav-born, Slovenian slalom canoeist who competed from the early 1980s to the mid-1990s. He won two medals in K1 team event at the ICF Canoe Slalom World Championships with a silver in 1987 and a bronze in 1985. He also finished tenth in the K1 event at the 1992 Summer Olympics in Barcelona.

World Cup individual podiums

References
Sports-Reference.com profile

1963 births
Canoeists at the 1992 Summer Olympics
Living people
Olympic canoeists of Slovenia
Slovenian male canoeists
Sportspeople from Ljubljana
Medalists at the ICF Canoe Slalom World Championships